Static Line was an email-based ASCII Ezine that focused on the PC demoscene.  It was a monthly publication with strong roots in the music aspect of the demoscene.  It ran for 52 issues starting in July 1998 and finishing in March 2004. 

Static Line was created in an effort to fill the void left by the closing of the DemoNews E-Zine (closing February 1998) and the TraxWeekly E-Zine (closing April 1996).  In most regards it succeeded and followed a similar format: an ASCII text-based magazine that was distributed via e-mail. While never reaching the large subscription rates that TraxWeekly boasted, it had a successful run and highlighted many aspects of the developing demoscene.

History of Static Line
Prior to the existence of Static Line, its creator, D. Travis North (aka: Coplan), wrote a music review column for an e-mag known as TraxWeekly.  After TraxWeekly stopped publication in 1996, Coplan wrote a few articles which were published under different magazines or individually over the course of the next two years.  Having already earned a reputation as a music reviewer, many demosceners were submitting songs for review, even though the magazine had long since dried up.  

In February 1998, DemoNews, another major demoscene e-mag, stopped publication.  This left a major void in the demoscene, and it put a damper on Coplan's plans as he had planned to bring his column to the DemoNews publication.  Having nowhere to publish his column, he began to draw up ideas to form a new e-mag to fill the void left by the defunct TraxWeekly and DemoNews.   

Static Line came to fruition early in 1998.  The invitation to join the mailing list was posted on the Hornet Archive in April 1998.  The official first issue of the e-mag was sent out via an e-mail mailing list in July 1998.  The first 24 issues of Static Line were released using a majordomo mailing list through the Kosmic Free Music Foundation server.  Starting at issue 25 in September 2000, the e-mag had grown in popularity and it had developed its own website which would later become known as SceneSpot.  Its distribution and online archives were now managed by this new server.

In mid-2003, Coplan offered up his editing position, for personal reasons, to anyone who was willing to carry out the management of the Static Line magazine.  The position was taken by Ciaran Hamilton and Ben Collver.  The first issue that was released under these new editors was issue #45 in June 2003.  In November of the same year, Issue #50 was the last issue released with Collver as co-editor.  

As the website model of demoscene news and articles grew more advanced, the ASCII e-zine format decreased in popularity amongst those involved in the demoscene.  Newer contributors to the demoscene were not attracted to the format that Static Line was known for, and article contributions decreased in volume.  As such, it was never able to maintain the monthly release rate that it had in previous years.  The magazine continued for 2 more issues and then closed as Ciaran himself no longer had the time to maintain the magazine, and no person was willing to take over the editor's chair.  

Issue #52, release March 2004, was the official  last issue of Static Line.

SceneSpot
As Static Line grew in popularity, it grew apparent that it would not maintain its success if it were an email-only publication. Late in 1999, the concept model for a demoscene web portal was developed by Coplan and Ranger Rick (Benjamin Reed, USA).  Originally, the intent of SceneSpot was to be a front-end for Static Line, with links to the archives and subscription pages.  It grew into a news center and discussion forums for many who participated in the North American Demoscene.  It was the discussion home for the Pilgrimage demo party for its first years.

SceneSpot never grew to the popularity that its magazine held.  After difficulties getting the portal off the ground, SceneSpot closed its doors early in 2006.

References

External links
 Archive of Static Line issues
 Static Line files at scene.org

Defunct computer magazines published in the United States
Demoscene
Magazines established in 1998
Magazines disestablished in 2004